Gresley may refer to

Church Gresley, village and former civil parish in the South Derbyshire district of Derbyshire, England
Frank Gresley (1855–1936), a British painter
Harold Gresley (1892–1967), son of Frank, also a British painter
Herbert Nigel Gresley (1876–1941), a locomotive engineer (designer)
Sir Nigel Gresley, 6th Baronet (c. 1727 – 1787), an English land-owner, mine-owner and builder